Anatomical Science International is a peer-reviewed medical journal that covers gross, histologic, cellular, molecular, biochemical, physiological and behavioral studies of humans and experimental animals. It is the official publication of the Japanese Association of Anatomists (formerly known as Kaibogaku Zasshi).

According to the Journal Citation Reports, the journal has a 2020 impact factor of 1.741.

References

External links 
Journal website
The Japanese Association of Anatomists

Springer Science+Business Media academic journals
Publications established in 2002
English-language journals
Anatomy journals
Quarterly journals